Lucyna trifida is a moth in the family Depressariidae. It was described by Beéche in 2012. It is found in Chile.

References

Moths described in 2012
Depressariinae
Endemic fauna of Chile